The Indian cricket team toured Sri Lanka from 6 August to 1 September 2015 to play a tour match and three Test matches. On 27 June 2015, Sri Lankan batsman Kumar Sangakkara said he would retire from international cricket after the second Test of the series. The Board of Control for Cricket in India (BCCI) and Sri Lanka Cricket Board confirmed the schedule of India's tour to Sri Lanka in August to September 2015. The tour started with a three-day warm-up game against Sri Lanka Board President's XI, followed by three Test matches. The Test matches were played at Galle, P Sara Oval, and SSC Colombo. The Indian team arrived in Sri Lanka on 4 August 2015.

Three different openers for India Shikhar Dhawan (134), Lokesh Rahul (108) and Cheteshwar Pujara (145) made centuries in the series. This was fifth time in Test history. The last happened in 1970 Ashes by John Edrich, Geoff Boycott and Brian Luckhurst for England.

India won the three-match series 2–1, with Virat Kohli winning his first Test series as captain of India, and this was the first series win by India in Sri Lanka since 1993. This series win also gave India their first overseas Test series victory since the 2011 tour in the West Indies.

Squads

1 Murali Vijay was ruled out of the first Test and also last Test due to a hamstring injury.2 Stuart Binny was added to India's squad before the second Test.3 Shikhar Dhawan was ruled out of the last two matches after fracturing his right hand in the first Test.4 Wriddhiman Saha was ruled out of the last Test due to a hamstring injury.5 Naman Ojha and Karun Nair were added to India's squad before the third Test.

Tour match

Three day:Sri Lanka Board President's XI vs Indians

Test series

1st Test

2nd Test

3rd Test

References

External links
 Series home at ESPN Cricinfo

2015 in Indian cricket
2015 in Sri Lankan cricket
International cricket competitions in 2015
Indian cricket tours of Sri Lanka